Kenchrina is a former settlement on the Black Sea coast. Anthony Bryer tentatively locates it on Cape Zephyrium. During the thirteenth and fourteenth centuries it was a part of the Empire of Trebizond.

References 

Black Sea port cities and towns in Turkey
Ancient Greek archaeological sites in Turkey
Geography of Pontus
Former populated places in Turkey